Sir Michael Anthony Arthur  (born 28 August 1950 in Vancouver), a senior British diplomat, was Her Majesty's British Ambassador to Germany, 2007–10. Previously, he served as the UK's High Commissioner in New Delhi. He then spent 8 years as a Vice President of the Boeing Company, including 4 years on the Executive Council as President of Boeing International.

Arthur was succeeded as British Ambassador to Germany by Sir Simon McDonald (later Baron McDonald of Salford).

Career
Arthur had previously worked in a number of positions within the Diplomatic Service, starting out in 1972 in the UK Mission to the United Nations, and moving in 1973 to the UK's Mission in Geneva working on the additional protocols to the Geneva Convention. Between 1981 and 1984, he was Private Secretary to the Lord Privy Seal and Minister of State in the Foreign Office, and in 1984 became First Secretary Political at the British Embassy in Bonn (then the administrative capital of West Germany). He was a Political Counselor at the Embassy in Paris from 1993 to 1997 and Deputy Head of Mission in Washington from 1999 to 2001.

In 2001, he was appointed Director General Europe and Economic at the Foreign Office and in 2003 succeeded Sir Rob Young as High Commissioner in New Delhi. He became Ambassador to Germany in 2007, succeeding Sir Peter Torry.

Arthur retired from HM Diplomatic Service in October 2010, being succeeded in Berlin by Sir Simon McDonald, a former British Ambassador to Israel and Head of Foreign and Defence Policy, Cabinet Office.

In 2013 Arthur joined Boeing UK and Ireland as a managing director, then appointed senior vice president of Boeing and president of Boeing International (the first ever non American on the Executive Council) from 22 April 2019 until January 2023

Personal life
He was educated at Watford Grammar school and then Rugby School before going up to Balliol College Oxford, becoming a fluent French and German speaker. He is married to Plaxy Gillian Beatrice, and has four children.

See also
British Embassy, Berlin

References

External links
Website of the British Embassy in Berlin

1950 births
Living people
People educated at Rugby School
Alumni of Balliol College, Oxford
Members of HM Diplomatic Service
Ambassadors of the United Kingdom to Germany
Knights Commander of the Order of St Michael and St George
Recipients of the Cross of the Order of Merit of the Federal Republic of Germany
20th-century British diplomats